Eucalyptus kabiana, commonly known as Mt Beerwah mallee, is a species of mallee, rarely a small tree, that is endemic to Queensland. It has smooth white to grey bark, sometimes with a short stocking of rough, fibrous bark at the base. The adult leaves are lance-shaped or curved, the flower buds are arranged in groups of between seven and eleven, the flowers are white and the fruit is hemispherical with protruding valves.

Description
Flowering occurs in October and the flowers are white.

Taxonomy and naming
Eucalyptus kabiana was first described in 1991 by Lawrie Johnson and Ken Hill from a specimen collected on the lower slopes of Mount Beerwah, and the description was published in the journal Telopea. The specific epithet commemorates the Kabi Kabi people, who inhabited the Glass House Mountains prior to European settlement.

Distribution and habitat
Mt Beerwah mallee grows in heath on steep trachyte slopes and is only known from Mt Beerwah and Mt Coolum.

Conservation status
This eucalypt is classed as "vulnerable" under the Australian Government Environment Protection and Biodiversity Conservation Act 1999 and under the Queensland Government Nature Conservation Act 1992. The main threats to the species are its restricted distribution and increased fire frequency.

See also
List of Eucalyptus species

References

Trees of Australia
kabiana
Myrtales of Australia
Flora of Queensland
Plants described in 1991
Taxa named by Lawrence Alexander Sidney Johnson
Taxa named by Ken Hill (botanist)